Mündü (Mondo) is a Ubangian language of South Sudan, with a few thousand speakers in the Democratic Republic of the Congo.

Locations
A 2013 survey reported that ethnic Mundu reside in the following bomas of South Sudan.
Amaki Boma, Kozi Payam, Maridi County
E'di Boma, Ngamunde Payam, Maridi County
Mundu Boma, Tore Payam, Yei County
Adio Boma, Tore Payam, Yei County

References

Ngbaka languages
Languages of South Sudan
Languages of the Democratic Republic of the Congo